Huber Ridge is a census-designated place (CDP) in Blendon Township, Franklin County, Ohio, United States. The population was 4,604 at the 2010 census.

Geography
Interstate 270, the beltway around Columbus, forms the northern and eastern edges of the CDP. The southern border is Ohio State Route 161 (E. Dublin Granville Road), and the southwest edge follows Alum Creek, a tributary of the Scioto River. The western edge of Huber Ridge is west of Ohio State Route 3 (Westerville Road).

The city of Columbus borders Huber Ridge to the west and south, and the city of Westerville is to the north, across I-270.

Demographics

As of the census of 2000, there were 4,883 people, 1,737 households, and 1,344 families residing in the CDP. The population density was 4,492.5 people per square mile (1,729.7/km2). There were 1,788 housing units at an average density of 1,645.0/sq mi (633.3/km2). The racial makeup of the CDP was 91.13% White, 5.47% Black or African American, 0.20% Native American, 0.98% Asian, 0.45% from other races, and 1.76% from two or more races. Hispanic or Latino of any race were 1.25% of the population.

There were 1,737 households, out of which 43.1% had children under the age of 18 living with them, 60.4% were married couples living together, 13.1% had a female householder with no husband present, and 22.6% were non-families. 17.0% of all households were made up of individuals, and 4.5% had someone living alone who was 65 years of age or older. The average household size was 2.81 and the average family size was 3.17.

In the CDP the population was spread out, with 30.9% under the age of 18, 7.5% from 18 to 24, 34.2% from 25 to 44, 19.9% from 45 to 64, and 7.5% who were 65 years of age or older. The median age was 32 years. For every 100 females there were 90.7 males. For every 100 females age 18 and over, there were 90.3 males.

The median income for a household in the CDP was $51,289, and the median income for a family was $55,855. Males had a median income of $37,386 versus $27,733 for females. The per capita income for the CDP was $19,842. About 2.2% of families and 3.8% of the population were below the poverty line, including 6.2% of those under age 18 and none of those age 65 or over.

References

Census-designated places in Franklin County, Ohio